Soil Fertility Centre ( – Marḵaz Khāḵshenāsī va Hāṣlekhīzī Khāḵ) is a populated place in Mohammadabad Rural District, in the Central District of Karaj County, Alborz Province, Iran. At the 2006 census, its population was 237, in 60 families.

References 

Populated places in Karaj County